Lauchlan MacLean Watt FRSE (24 October 1867 – 11 September 1957) was the minister of Glasgow Cathedral from 1923–34, and the Moderator of the General Assembly of the Church of Scotland in 1933. He was a published poet and author, and a literary critic.

Life 

Maclean Watt was born on 24 October 1867 at Grantown-on-Spey, Morayshire, the only son of Margaret Gillanders MacLean from Skye, and her husband Andrew MacLean Watt.

He studied for a general degree at University of Edinburgh graduating with an MA in 1894. He then went on to study divinity, graduating with a BD in 1897. He received his licence to preach in the Church of Scotland at the Presbytery of Dalkeith on 12 May 1896.

He was ordained as minister of Turriff in 1897. In 1901 he was translated to the joint parishes of Alloa and Tullibody. In 1911 he moved to the prestigious St Stephen's Church, Edinburgh. Soon after arrival he was elected a Fellow of the Royal Society of Edinburgh. His proposers were Rev Thomas Burns, Norman Macleod, George Chrystal and Arthur Pillans Laurie.

In 1907 he accompanied the King of Denmark to Iceland as a correspondent for The Times, The Scotsman and The Manchester Guardian. During the World War I he was a chaplain with the Gordon Highlanders in the 7th Division. He was sent by the Government as Commissioner to the US and Canada in 1918 to clarify UK war aims. In 1920 the University of Edinburgh awarded him the honorary doctorate DD.

In 1923 he moved to High Kirk of Glasgow, better known as Glasgow Cathedral (1923–34).

He was Turnbull Trust preacher at The Scots' Church in Melbourne in 1932. The University of Glasgow awarded him an honorary doctorate (LLD) in 1933 for his publications.

In 1933 he was elected Moderator of the General Assembly of the Church of Scotland, in succession to Very Rev Hugh ross Mackintosh, the highest position in his church. On completion of this duty in the summer of 1934 he retired aged 67. He was succeeded as Moderator by Rev Peter Donald Thomson.

He died at Lochcarron on 11 September 1957 and is buried in the Lochcarron Burial Ground at the east end of the Lochcarron Old Parish Church.

Publications

He was a prolific author in prose and verse, on folk-lore, history and antiquities, especially Celtic and Gaelic as well as aspects of religion, literature and the life of a soldier, and gave the Warrack Lectures and McNeil-Frazer Lectures on preaching in 1930.

A number of his poems and books are war-related.

I Bind My Heart this Tide (hymn - 1907)
The Tryst: A Book of the Soul (1907)
Scottish Life and Poetry (1912)
In the Land of War (1915)
The Soldier's Friend (1916)
The Heart of a Soldier (1918)
The Gordon Highlanders (1918)
While the Candle Burns (1933)
Scottish Ballads and Ballad Writing
The Cameron Highlanders
The Hills of Home (this appears to be the basis of the song "A Scottish Soldier")
The Book of the Beloved
The Advocate's Wig
Edragil 1745
By Still Waters
Thomas Carlyle
The Preacher's Life and Work
Douglas's Aeneid

Family

In June 1897 he married Jenny (or Jeannie) Hall Reid. They had one son, Hector MacLean Watt (b.1900).

References

1867 births
1957 deaths
20th-century Ministers of the Church of Scotland
Moderators of the General Assembly of the Church of Scotland
Scottish poets
Scottish literary critics
Alumni of the University of Edinburgh
Ministers of Glasgow Cathedral
19th-century Ministers of the Church of Scotland